Bennington Peak is located on the border of Alberta and British Columbia. It was named in 1922 by Arthur O. Wheeler, in commemoration of Bennington, Vermont, the birthplace of explorer Simon Fraser.

Climate
Based on the Köppen climate classification, the mountain is located in a subarctic climate with cold, snowy winters, and mild summers. However, these months coincide with mosquito season, which requires effective defenses. Precipitation runoff from the peak drains into tributaries of the Athabasca River on its east side, and the headwaters of the Fraser River from the west side.

See also
List of peaks on the Alberta–British Columbia border

References

Three-thousanders of Alberta
Three-thousanders of British Columbia
Canadian Rockies